Jorge Gómez may refer to:

 Jorge Gómez (cyclist) (born 1956), Cuban cyclist
 Jorge Gómez Baillo (born 1959), Argentine chess player
 Jorge Gómez (footballer) (born 1968), Chilean footballer

See also
 Jorge Gomes (disambiguation)